The following events related to sociology occurred in the 1880s.

1881
Pierre Guillaume Frédéric le Play creates the sociological magazine La Reforme Sociale.

1882
Friedrich Nietzsche's The Gay Science is published.
Leslie Stephen's The Science of Ethics is published.

1883

Lester Frank Ward's Dynamic Sociology is published.
Francis Galton's Inquiries into Human Faculty and Its Development is published.
Thomas Hill Green's Prolegomena to Ethics is published.
Ludwig Gumplowicz's Race Struggle is published.
Carl Menger's Investigations into the Method of the Social Sciences with Special Reference to Economics is published.
Friedrich Nietzsche's Thus Spoke Zarathustra is published.
Henry Sidgwick's Principles of Political Economy is published.
William Sumner's What Social Classes Owe Each Other is published.

Births
February 8: Joseph Schumpeter

Deaths
March 9: Arnold Toynbee
March 14: Karl Marx

1884
Friedrich Engels' The Origin of the Family, Private Property and the State is published.
Carl Menger's The Errors of Historicism is published.
Gaetano Mosca's Theory of Governments and Parliamentary Government is published.
Foundation of the Fabian Society

1885
Ludwig Gumplowicz's Outline for Sociology is published.
Sir Henry James Sumner Maine's Popular Government is published.
The Second Volume of Karl Marx's Capital is published (edited by Engels).

1886
Friedrich Nietzsche's Beyond Good and Evil is published.
Jose Rizal's Dimanche des Rameaux is published in Berlin.

1887
Friedrich Nietzsche's On the Genealogy of Morals is published.
Ferdinand Tönnies' Gemeinschaft and Gesellschaft is published.

1888
James Bryce's The American Commonwealth is published.

Births
July 6: Eugen Rosenstock-Huessy

Deaths
February 3: Henry Maine

1889
Jane Addams establishes The Social Settlement in Chicago.
Henri Bergson's Time and Free Will is published.
Jose Rizal's Filipinas dentro de cien años, a socio-political essay, is published in Madrid.

Sociology
Sociology timelines